Butterfly Beach may refer to;
 Butterfly Beach, a beach near the city of Santa Barbara in Montecito, California, United States
 Butterfly Beach, a beach in Tuen Mun District, the New Territories, Hong Kong (see Beaches of Hong Kong)
 Butterfly Beach, a beach near Palolem Beach, Goa, India